Olga Badelka (born 8 July 2002) is a Belarusian chess player, currently playing for the Russian Chess Federation, who holds the FIDE title of International Master (IM, 2019). In 2021, she was on the chess team of the University of Missouri in the United States.As of 2022, Badelka now plays chess full-time.

Biography
Olga Badelka is multiple winner of Belarusian Youth Chess Championships for girls in different age groups:
U16 (2017), U18 (2017), U20 (2016).

She repeatedly represented Belarus at the European Youth Chess Championships and World Youth Chess Championships in different age groups, where she won five medals: gold (in 2017, at the European Youth Chess Championship in the U16 girls age group), three silver (in 2012, at the World Youth Chess Championship in the U10 girls age group, and in 2018, at the European Youth Chess Championship in the U16 girls age group, and in 2019, at the European Youth Chess Championship in the U18 girls age group) and bronze (in 2014, at the World Youth Chess Championship in the U12 girls age group). In 2013, Badelka won World School Chess Championship in the U11 girls age group. She four time played for Belarus in World Youth U16 Chess Olympiads (2014-2017).

In 2017, in Riga, Badelka participated in the Women's European Individual Chess Championship.

Badelka played for Belarus in the Women's Chess Olympiads:
 In 2016, at third board in the 42nd Chess Olympiad (women) in Baku (+5, =3, -2),
 In 2018, at first board in the 43rd Chess Olympiad (women) in Batumi (+3, =5, -1).

In 2017, she received the FIDE Woman International Master (WIM) title.  She received the International Master (IM) and Woman Grandmaster (WGM) titles in 2019.

In 2021, Badelka played the Bongcloud (doubled but not drawn) against Magnus Carlsen during a blitz event. Carlsen dubbed the move "...very silly and a little bit legendary..."

In 2021, she entered the University of Missouri in the United States, joining the university's chess team and majoring in linguistics.

References

External links
 
 
 

2002 births
Living people
People from Mogilev
Belarusian female chess players
Chess Woman International Masters
Chess Olympiad competitors